This list of New Mexico Activities Association championships gives the past US state of New Mexico champions of New Mexico Activities Association in all sports.

Fall sports

Cross Country

Football
 

 * Co-champs
 ** Co-op program
 *** Six-Man was not sanctioned by the NMAA at this time
 # Championships determined by a points system.  Beginning in 1953 championships were determined by a playoff system

Volleyball

Soccer

Winter sports

Wrestling

Swimming and Diving

Boys' Basketball

Girls' Basketball

Spirit/Dance/Drill

Spirit/Cheer

Spring sports

Baseball

Boys' Golf

Girls' Golf

Softball

Boys' Tennis

Girls' Tennis

Small Team Tennis

Boys' Track and Field

Girls' Track and Field

Team titles

Schools with most team titles

Schools with most team titles in one sport

Activities (non-sports)

Athletic Training Challenge

Bowling

Chess

Esports

JROTC

Choir

Concert Band

Orchestra

References

Sports in New Mexico
New Mexico sports-related lists